The 37 provinces and their departments, in the Republic of Gran Colombia from 1824 to 1831. 

Gran Colombia was a country in northern South America from 1819 to 1831.  Its subdivisions were redrawn in 1824, from the original 3 departments into 3 districts with departments and provinces.

See also
Subdivisions of Gran Colombia — districts, departments, & provinces.

 
Subdivisions of Gran Colombia